Kanami (written: 佳南, 佳奈美 or 夏菜美) is a feminine Japanese given name. Notable people with the name include:

, Japanese synchronized swimmer
, Japanese ice hockey player
, Japanese volleyball player
, Lead guitarist of Band-Maid

Fictional characters
, a character in the light novel series Log Horizon
, a character in the media franchise Toji no Miko
, a character in the video game Persona 4: Dancing All Night
, a character in the light novel series Is This a Zombie?
, a character in the light novel series So I'm a Spider, So What?
, a character in the visual novel After...

Japanese feminine given names